Shahzada Mirza Muhammad Hakim (Persian: میرزا محمد حکیم) (29 April 1553 – 10 October 1585), sometimes known simply as Mirza Hakim, was the third son of the Mughal emperor Humayun. He ruled Kabul in Afghanistan, and often conflicted with his elder brother, Emperor Akbar. Mirza Hakim  later on mended ways with Emperor Akbar. He is the son of Mah Chuchak Begum. He is known for writing Tajdar-e-Haram.

Invasion of afghanistan

Per Tabakat-i-Akbari of Nizamuddin Ahmad, Mughal Emperor Akbar had dispatched Hakim, who was a staunch adherent of the missionary-minded Naqshbandi Sufi order, against the infidels of Katwar in 1582. Hakim was a semi-independent governor of Kabul. The Sifat-nama-yi Darviš Muhammad Hān-i Ğāzī of Kadi Muhammad Salim who accompanied the expedition mentions its details. The Sifat-nama gives Muhammad Hakim the epithet of Darviš Khan Gazi.

Muhammad Darvish's religious crusade fought its way from Laghman to Alishang, and is stated to have conquered and converted 66 valleys to Islam. After conquering Tajau and Nijrau valleys in Panjshir area, the crusaders established a fort at Islamabad at confluence of Alishang and Alingar rivers. They continued the raid up to Alishang and made their last effort against the non-Muslims of Alingar, fighting up to Mangu, the modern border between Pashai and Ashkun-speaking areas.

Rebellion

Akhlaq-i-Hakimi written by his secretary confirmed the commitment of Kabul's kingdom to the supremacy of Islam and Muslims, unlike the court of Akbar which inched towards tolerating difference and protection of people of all faiths. He also swore fealty to Babur while Akbar had embraced Humayun. By presenting himself as a contrast to Akbar, he became a focus of anti-Akbar rebels who requested him to invade and dethrone Akbar in 1566 and 1581. His invasion however met with little success as only a few north Indians supported him.

Hakim made a plea to Akbar's Central Asian officers to not help him occupy Kabul and instead attack the Indians in the Mughal army. His efforts however failed and Kabul was occupied. Hakim was defeated in 1582 and his prime minister Khwaja Hasan Naqshbandi was exiled by Akbar. After his death in 1585 due to alcohol poisoning, Akbar had his sons expelled to India and ended his princely appanage.

References

1553 births
1585 deaths
Mughal princes
Akbar